Susanna "Zan" Rowe is an Australian radio and television presenter.  she works for ABC digital radio station Double J.

Early life 
Rowe grew up in Melbourne. She attended university at RMIT University, majoring in radio and cinema.

Career

Radio 
Rowe started out at SRA FM in 1996 (now SYN Radio) on a show called Run with the Hunted, before moving to the Monday drive shift on 3RRR 102.7FM presenting Transit Lounge from 2002–2004.

In 2005, she joined Triple J as weekend lunch host.

In 2006, she became host of Mornings on Triple J, broadcasting weekdays between 9am and 12pm. She hosted this show on the network until December 2017.

Rowe began the podcast Bang on with Myf Warhurst in March 2017.

On 4 December 2017, Rowe announced she would be leaving Triple J and joining digital radio network Double J. In 2018 she started at Double J as host of the Mornings show. The show is the home of her flagship feature and podcast, Take 5. The segment has featured many guests over the years, including Paul McCartney, Damon Albarn, Kylie Minogue, Tori Amos and Peter Garrett.

Television 
In 2009, Rowe joined music presenter Richard Kingsmill in presenting a special edition of Rage, Triple J Hottest 100 of All Time, broadcast over two nights on the weekend of Friday 7 August 2009.

In 2015–2016, Rowe presented The Critics for ABC iview, a program on screen culture.

In 2017, Rowe was announced as one of the panellists for ABC TV's new screen review show Screen Time, hosted by Chris Taylor.

Since 2017, Rowe and Charlie Pickering have hosted the New Year's Eve countdown show on the ABC.

Rowe presents a weekly segment 'The Beat' on News Breakfast to discuss music news. She has also hosted various other programs on the ABC, including Double J, as well as written for the ABC about the Australian musical industry.

Since 2020, Rowe has co-hosted weekly music program The Sound on the ABC. Rowe was one of the hosts of the ABC's 90th birthday celebration,  alongside Tony Armstrong, and Craig Reucassel.

Rowe hosted Take 5, a television version of her radio segment, which premiered in September 2022.

References

External links

1978 births
Living people
Triple J announcers